Sarah Boudens-Baillie (born February 28, 1983 in Pembroke, Ontario) is a Canadian slalom canoeist who competed at the international level from 2000 to 2012. She was eliminated in the qualifying round of the K1 event at the 2008 Summer Olympics in Beijing, finishing in 19th place.

She is married to 2012 Olympic champion in C2 Tim Baillie.

World Cup individual podiums

1 Pan American Championship counting for World Cup points

References

1983 births
Canadian female canoeists
Canoeists at the 2008 Summer Olympics
Living people
Olympic canoeists of Canada
Sportspeople from Pembroke, Ontario
Sportspeople from Ontario